Saint and Blurry is an album by John Hegley released in 1993 by Rykodisc.

It consists of a mixture of poems and songs. All poems were written by Hegley but some songs were written by Hegley with Nigel Piper.

Track listing
An asterisk indicates songs

 In The Beginning
 Trainspotters*
 The Martian
 Song About Cleaning Your Glasses*
 Luton
 The Children in the Playground
 Greavsie
 Eddie Don't Like Furniture*
 Yorkie
 Mr. McNaulty
 A Dog's Life*
 Well Bread Dog
 Sumo*
 Pat
 Colin*
 The Briefcase
 Contact Lenses Out*
 Bad Dog
 Very Bad Dog*
 Malcolm
 Death of a Dog*
 Seaing the Sea
 The Edinburgh Tattoo
 Poetry*

1993 albums